The Logistic Regiment "Taurinense" is a military logistics regiment of the Italian Army based in Rivoli in Piedmont. Today the regiment is the logistic unit of the Alpine Brigade "Taurinense" and shares with the brigade's infantry troops, the Alpini, the distinctive Cappello Alpino.

History 
On 31 December 1964 1st Auto Unit of the 1st Drivers Center of the Northwestern Military Region became an autonomous unit as I Mixed Maneuver Auto Unit. Based in Turin the unit was tasked to transport fuel, ammunition, and materiel between the military region's depots and brigade logistic battalions, which provided close support to the brigade's combat units. On 1 October 1990 the unit was renamed Transport Battalion "Monviso". The battalion was granted a new flag, which it received on 28 March 1991 together with the traditions of the 1st Drivers Regiment, which had been formed on 1 July 1942 and disbanded on 8 September 1943 after the announcement of the Armistice of Cassibile. As per army naming convention for logistic units supporting corps-level commands the battalion was named after a geographic feature in the military region's area of operations: the Monviso mountain.

On 5 November 1996 the battalion absorbed the companies of the disbanded Logistic Battalion "Cremona" of the Motorized Brigade "Cremona" and became the 1st Military Region Logistic Unit "Monviso". Afterwards the flag of the Logistic Battalion "Cremona" was transferred to the Shrine of the Flags in the Vittoriano in Rome, where it remained until 28 October 2019 when it was retrieved and assigned to the newly formed Logistic Regiment "Sassari". On 1 July 1998 the unit was renamed 1st Logistic Support Regiment "Monviso".

Logistic Battalion "Taurinense" 

On 1 February 2001 the regiment absorbed part of the disbanded Logistic Battalion "Taurinense" of the Alpine Brigade "Taurinense". The Logistic Battalion "Taurinense" had been formed on 1 December 1962 as Services Unit "Taurinense" in Rivoli and repeatedly changed composition and name until the 1975 army reform, when it became the Logistic Battalion "Taurinense" and was granted a new flag on 12 November 1976 by decree 846 of the President of the Italian Republic Giovanni Leone.

Initially the battalion consisted of a command platoon, two light logistic units, a medium logistic unit, the 101st Field Hospital, and two medical units, but already on 1 June 1978 the 101st Field Hospital left the battalion to become the army's only Air-transportable Medical Unit, which would have deployed, in case of a NATO-Warsaw Pact war, to Norway as part of NATO's Allied Command Europe Mobile Force. The rest of the battalion was reorganized on 1 November 1981 and consisted from then until being disbanded of the following units:

  Battalion Command, in Rivoli
 Command and Services Company
 Supply Company
 Medium Transport Company
 Maintenance Company
 Medical (Reserve) Unit

After being disbanded the flag of the Logistic Battalion "Taurinense", which had been awarded a Bronze Cross of Army Merit for the units participation in the United Nations Operation in Mozambique, was transferred to the Shrine of the Flags in the Vittoriano in Rome.

Recent times 
On the same date the 1st Logistic Support Regiment "Monviso" absorbed part of the Logistic Battalion "Taurinense" it also incorporated the Air-transportable Medical Unit "Taurinense" and entered the Logistic Projection Brigade. Fielding a command and logistic support company, s supply battalion, a medical battalion, and two maintenance companies, the regiment was renamed 1st Maneuver Regiment on 1 April 2001. The two maintenance companies were later merged into a maintenance battalion and the regiment then consisted of:

  Regimental Command, in Rivoli
 Supply Battalion
 Maintenance Battalion
 Medical Battalion

On 1 March 2013 the regiment was transferred to the Alpine Brigade "Taurinense" and on 1 January 2015 it was renamed Logistic Regiment "Taurinense".

Current structure 
Like all Italian Army brigade logistic units the Logistic Regiment "Taurinense" consists of:

  Regimental Command, in Rivoli
 Logistic Battalion
 Command
 Tactical Control Squad
 Supply Company
 Transport Company
 Maintenance Company
 Command and Logistic Support Company
 C3 Platoon
 Transport and Materiel Platoon
 Deployment Support Platoon
 Commissariat Platoon
 Garrison Support Unit

The Regimental Command consists of the Commandant's and Personnel Office, the Operations, Training and Information Office, the Logistic Office, and the Administration Office.

See also 
 Military logistics

External links
Italian Army Website: Reggimento Logistico "Taurinense"

References 

Logistic Regiments of Italy
Military units and formations established in 1998